This is a list of films produced in the Tollywood Telugu language film industry ordered by year of release in the 1970s.

Highest-grossing films
 Adavi Ramudu...
 Vetagaadu...
 Driver Ramudu...
 Yamagola...
 Soggadu...
 Alluri Seetharama Raju...

The list

References 

1970s
Telugu
Telugu films